Arborite is the leading Canadian manufacturer of high-pressure decorative plastic laminates (HPL).  Best known as a counter top surfacing material, laminate is a durable decorative veneer applied to cabinetry, furniture, and other horizontal and vertical surfaces. The original Arborite material was developed in 1942 by the Howard Smith Paper Company as an innovative way to utilize waste by-products of the Canadian papermaking industry, and to this day laminate is commonly referred to in Canada by the trade name Arborite.

What is laminate? (HPL) 
Laminate is a material made by bonding layers of material or materials. Laminate, in technical terminology, is referred to as High Pressure Laminate (HPL) or even more accurately as High Pressure Decorative Plastic Laminate since there are also industrial high pressure laminates which are not decorative.

The decorative high pressure laminates in our homes and offices, etc. consist of sheets of paper that have been coated or impregnated with two types of resin, stacked on top of each other and placed into a press where they are cooked at a minimum of 265 degrees F. at a pressure of approximately 1,200 pounds per square inch (psi) for about an hour. Under this pressure and heat the resins flow, transforming the stack and the resins into a single sheet of homogeneous composite material. "Plastic" laminate is a misleading term because the material is approximately 70% paper and 30% polymer (phenolic and melamine) resin.

History 
The Howard Smith Paper Company was founded in 1912 by C. Howard Smith (1873 – 1931) in an abandoned cotton mill in Beauharnois, Québec, Canada on the shores of Lake St. Louis.  By 1914, this one-machine mill was in high production, churning out rag paper.  In 1916, Howard Smith acquired the newsprint business of Edwin Crabtree in Crabtree Mills, Quebec, and by 1919, they had also purchased the Toronto Paper Company Limited of Cornwall, Ontario.  Over the next 20 years, Howard Smith would acquire an additional four paper companies in various locations across Canada, and expand the operations at each of the facilities.

Howard Smith Paper Company was committed to the conservation of Canada's forests and the sustainability of their source material.  In 1937, for their 25th anniversary, the company published a history called "25 Years of Progress"; in it, President Harold Crabtree's mission statement states, "Our aim, primarily, is that of serving the Canadian trade with quality papers at fair prices, conserving the forest wealth of Canada, from which we draw our raw materials, not only to the end that our vast operations may be served for the immediate future, but that future generations, too, may have the same privileges and enjoyment of these forests as ourselves."

Edmund Howard Smith, the son of C. Howard and Alice Young Day, followed his father in the family business.  He was born and raised in Montreal, Québec and trained as an industrialist at McGill University.  After graduation, he worked his way up in his father's company, from a business clerk to president of the Howard Smith Paper Company in 1946.  Both Edmund Howard and his father held the position of President of the Canadian Pulp and Paper Association at various points in their careers.

Edmund was convinced that waste from the paper making process could be transformed into a useful product in its own right.  He began working with fellow McGill graduate Dr. George Tomlinson II, the chief of research and development at Howard Smith Paper; his father, Dr. George Tomlinson Sr, had previously been in the same position at Howard Smith and while there had patented the ingenious Tomlinson recovery boiler. For four years, these two young men spearheaded experiments to develop a process for separating and extracting lignin from kraft black liquor, a by-product of paper making; in 1946 Smith and Tomlinson were awarded a patent for the resulting material, which they named "Arborite".  Though it is not recorded how they arrived at that name, likely is because ‘arbor’ is the Latin word for tree, and the fact that the parent company was a paper manufacturer concerned about the welfare of the Canadian forests from which their trees were sourced.

Production presses were established and a company was formed. Edmund Howard Smith went on to become Arborite's first president, with George Tomlinson Jr. as his chief engineer.  Arborite was the first commercial decorative melamine laminate.  The manufacturing facility was opened in 1948 in LaSalle, Quebec, where it still is to this day.  By early 1949, Arborite was being advertised as the "only all-Canadian" laminate on the market, available in 35 "solid colors, as well as a series of five colored fabric designs, two tones of "marble" and a wide variety of simulated wood grains."

Residential 
Arborite was originally marketed not to design or construction firms, but directly to housewives looking for a "modern surfacing material".  One of the new material's first marketing platforms was the popular Chatelaine ladies’ home magazine, where it was touted as being "tested and approved by the Chatelaine Institute".

By the early 1950s, Arborite was available in more than 60 colors and patterns, mostly solid colors and wood grains.  In 1954, Western Woods built 10 trend houses across Canada, representing the epitome in modern design and materials.  Arborite was chosen for kitchen and bathroom surfaces in many of these model homes.  1958 saw the introduction of new lines of pastel Glitter and Metallic Tone laminates, closely followed by Stardust  (a random breakup pattern) and Fantasy (abstract mid-century stars).  Woodgrain patterns at this time included Sliced Walnut, Fawn English Walnut and Blond Persian Walnut.

By 1962, Arborite had branched into the United Kingdom.  This is from Design magazine in 1965:  "Arborite decorative laminates only appeared in Britain in 1960, but already they have radically effected the decorative laminates scene here.  The company established its name with its woodgrains and marbles, and has recently launched the most comprehensive plain colour range on the British market, as well as issuing an architectural manual."

Then, in 1963, came one of the most pivotal changes in the history of the company. Howard Smith Paper Mills Ltd. was acquired by Domtar Inc, one of the largest manufacturing enterprises in Canada at the time; Arborite was now a division of Domtar Construction materials.

In the merger, Dr. George Tomlinson II was retained by Domtar as the Director of Research.  He went on to have an over-thirty-year history with the company, and won the TAPPI (Technical Association of the Pulp and Paper Industry) medal in 1969 for his outstanding contributions to lignin chemistry and pulping technology.  By the 1980s, Dr. Tomlinson was semi-retired but was still an advisor/consultant for Domtar, publishing articles and books about the effects of acid rain on the forests of North America—still concerned about environmental responsibility in the paper industry.

Commercial 
The 1970s saw a shift in marketing, from the residential market to a more corporate focus.  Arborite was advertised as "An excellent choice for architects, designers and furniture manufacturers alike."

Over 140 patterns and colors were available at this point, including East Indian Teak and Black Leather, with "new Metallic and Fabric laminates".  Many of the 52 solid colors could be seen as epitomizing the decade, from Bitter Lemon and Dusty Olive, to Pale Avocado and Minton Blue.  Application locations of Arborite laminate included McGill University, high-end hotels, corporate offices and private, architect-designed residences, and Canadian Pacific rail car interiors.

References

External links 
 Company website

Woodworking materials
Brand name materials